Derek M. Tournear is an American physicist and defense official serving as the director of the Space Development Agency. Previously he served as the Principal Director for Space in the Department of Defense office of Research and Engineering. He has worked at the Harris Corporation, Exelis Inc., Office of the Director of National Intelligence, DARPA, and Los Alamos National Laboratory.

Tournear graduated from the Purdue University in 1999 with a Bachelor of Science degree in physics. He later earned a PhD in physics from Stanford University.

References

External links 
 

Living people
Year of birth missing (living people)